Compulsion is a 1956 crime novel by the American writer Meyer Levin. Set in 1924 Chicago, it is inspired by the real-life Leopold and Loeb trial, and was a bestseller. Two college students kidnap and kill a boy in order to prove they can get away with the perfect crime.

The following year it was adapted by Levin into a stage play of the same title, which premiered at the Ambassador Theatre on Broadway and ran for 140 performances between October 24, 1957 and February 24, 1958. The lead roles were played by Dean Stockwell and Roddy McDowall.

Film adaptation

In 1959, the novel was made into the film Compulsion by Hollywood studio 20th Century Fox. Directed by Richard Fleischer it starred Orson Welles, Diane Varsi and Bradford Dillman with Stockwell reviving his role from the stage play.

References

Bibliography
 

1956 American novels
American crime novels
American novels adapted into films
Cultural depictions of Clarence Darrow
Cultural depictions of Leopold and Loeb
Novels set in Chicago
Novels set in the 1920s
Roman à clef novels
Simon & Schuster books